This page lists the armoury emblazons, heraldic descriptions, or coats of arms of the communes in Nord (D-H)

Complete lists of Nord armorial pages 

 Armorial of the Communes of Nord (A–C)
 Armorial of the Communes of Nord (D–H)
 Armorial of the Communes of Nord (I–P)
 Armorial of the Communes of Nord (Q–Z)

D

E

F

G

H

See also 
 Armorial of the Communes of Nord (A–C)
 Armorial of the Communes of Nord (I–P)
 Armorial of the Communes of Nord (Q–Z)

References

External links 
 Liste des blasonnements des communes de Flandre et d'Artois

Nord (French department)
Nord